The Newfoundland and Labrador House of Assembly is the unicameral deliberative assembly of the General Assembly of Newfoundland and Labrador of the province of Newfoundland and Labrador, Canada. It meets in the Confederation Building in St. John's. Bills passed by the assembly are given royal assent by the King of Canada in Right of Newfoundland and Labrador, represented by the lieutenant governor of Newfoundland and Labrador.

The governing party sits on the left side of the speaker of the House of Assembly as opposed to the traditional right side of the speaker. This tradition dates back to the 1850s as the heaters in the Colonial Building were located on the left side. Thus, the government chose to sit near the heat, and leave the opposition sitting in the cold.

Homes of Legislature

Before 1850 the legislature has sat at various locations including Mary Travers' tavern on Duckworth Street across from War Memorial 1832, St. John's Court House (at Duckworth and Church Hill) from 1833 to 1846, a building on southwest corner of Water Street and Prescott Street (since replaced with office building) and the site of the former St. Patrick’s Hall on Queen’s Road and Garrison Hill (demolished and replace by current building 1880). 

Permanent homes of the legislature, Confederation Building and Colonial Building, are the only surviving structures.

Constituencies 

Members represent one electoral district each.

Seating plan

Current as of March 2022

Current members (MHAs)

Party leaders' names are written in bold and cabinet ministers in italic, with the Speaker of the House of Assembly designated by a dagger (†).

Seat total and official layout

|- style="background:#ccc;"
!rowspan="2" colspan="2" style="text-align:left;"|Party
!rowspan="2" style="text-align:left;"|Leader
!colspan="2" style="text-align:center;"|Seats
|- style="background:#ccc;"
| style="text-align:center;"|March 25, 2021
| style="text-align:center;"|Current

| style="text-align:left;" |Andrew Furey
|23 |||23

| style="text-align:left;" |David Brazil
|13 ||12

| style="text-align:left;" |Jim Dinn
|2 ||3

| style="text-align:left;" |N/A
|2
|2

| style="text-align:left;" |N/A
|0
|0
|-
| style="text-align:left;" colspan="3"|Members
!40!!40
|}

See also
50th General Assembly of Newfoundland and Labrador
48th General Assembly of Newfoundland and Labrador
47th General Assembly of Newfoundland and Labrador
Speaker of the House of Assembly of Newfoundland and Labrador
List of Newfoundland and Labrador General Assemblies

References

External links
 
 Canadian Governments Compared

Newfoundland and Labrador

Newfoundland